Auguste Garrebeek  (10 January 1912 – 20 October 1973) was a cyclist from  Belgium. He won the bronze medal in the team road race at the 1936 Summer Olympics along with  Armand Putzeys and François Vandermotte.

References

1912 births
1973 deaths
Belgian male cyclists
Cyclists at the 1936 Summer Olympics
Medalists at the 1936 Summer Olympics
Olympic bronze medalists for Belgium
Olympic cyclists of Belgium
Olympic medalists in cycling
People from Beersel
Cyclists from Flemish Brabant
20th-century Belgian people